The following outline is provided as an overview of and topical guide to Arunachal Pradesh:

Arunachal Pradesh – northeasternmost state of the Republic of India. Geographically, it is the largest among the North-east Indian states commonly known as the Seven Sister States. As in other parts of Northeast India, the people native to the state trace their origins to the Tibeto-Burman people. Arunachal Pradesh has close to 61,000 square kilometres of forests, and forest products are the next most significant sector of the economy. Among the crops grown here are rice, maize, millet, wheat, pulses, sugarcane, ginger, and oilseeds. Arunachal is also ideal for horticulture and fruit orchards. Its major industries are rice mills, fruit preservation and processing units, and handloom handicrafts. Sawmills and plywood trades are prohibited under law.

General reference

Names 
 Common name: Arunachal Pradesh
 Pronunciation: 
 Previously known as:
 North-East Frontier Agency
 Union Territory of Arunachal Pradesh (20 January 1972 to 20 February 1987.)
 Official name: Arunachal Pradesh
 Adjectival(s): Arunachali
 Demonym(s): Arunachalis
 Abbreviations and name codes
 ISO 3166-2 code: IN-AR

Rankings (amongst India's states and union territories) 

 by population: 31st
 by area (2011 census): 15th
 by crime rate (2016): 17th
 by gross domestic product (GDP) (2014): 27th
by Human Development Index (HDI)(2017): 24th
by life expectancy at birth: 
by literacy rate (2011 census): 34th

Geography of Arunachal Pradesh 

Geography of Arunachal Pradesh
 Arunachal Pradesh is: an Indian state, one of the Seven Sister States
 Population of Arunachal Pradesh: 1,382,611
 Area of Arunachal Pradesh: 83,743 km2 (32,333 sq mi)
 Atlas of Arunachal Pradesh

Location of Arunachal Pradesh 
 Arunachal Pradesh is situated within the following regions:
 Northern Hemisphere
 Eastern Hemisphere
 Eurasia
 Asia
 South Asia
 India
 Northeast India
 Time zone(s): Indian Standard Time (IST) (UTC+05:30)

Environment of Arunachal Pradesh 

 Climate of Arunachal Pradesh
 Topography of Arunachal Pradesh
 Biome types in Arunachal Pradesh
 Tropical and Sub-tropical forests
 Temperate forest
 Pine forests
 Subalpine forest
 Wildlife of Arunachal Pradesh
 Flora of Arunachal Pradesh

Natural geographic features of Arunachal Pradesh 

 Hills in Arunachal Pradesh
 Patkai
 Mountains in Arunachal Pradesh
 Himalayas
 Rivers in Arunachal Pradesh
 Dibang River
 Kameng River
 Lohit River
 Tirap River
Subansiri River

Protected areas of Arunachal Pradesh 

 Dibang Wildlife Sanctuary
 Dihang-Dibang Biosphere Reserve
 Eaglenest Wildlife Sanctuary
 Kameng Elephant Reserve
 Kamlang Wildlife Sanctuary
 Mehao Wildlife Sanctuary
 Mouling National Park
 Namdapha National Park
 Sessa Orchid Sanctuary
 Talley Valley Wildlife Sanctuary

Regions of Arunachal Pradesh

Ecoregions of Arunachal Pradesh 
 Brahmaputra Valley semi-evergreen forests
 Eastern Himalayan broadleaf forests
 Eastern Himalaya subalpine conifer forests
 Northeastern Himalayan subalpine conifer forests
 Eastern Himalayan alpine shrub and meadows

Administrative divisions of Arunachal Pradesh

Districts of Arunachal Pradesh 

 Districts of Arunachal Pradesh
 Tawang district
 West Kameng district
 East Kameng district
 Pakke-Kessang district
 Papum Pare district
 Kurung Kumey district
 Kra Daadi district
 Lower Subansiri district
 Upper Subansiri district
 West Siang district
 Siang district
 Upper Siang district
 Lower Siang district
 Lepa-Rada district
 Shi-Yomi district
 East Siang district
 Lower Dibang Valley district
 Upper Dibang Valley district
 Lohit district
 Anjaw district
 Namsai district
 Changlang district
 Tirap district
 Longding district
 Kamle district

Municipalities of Arunachal Pradesh 

Cities and towns in Arunachal Pradesh
 Capital of Arunachal Pradesh: Itanagar
 Along
 Bomdila
 Daporijo
 Naharlagun
 Pasighat
 Seppa
 Tawang
 Tezu
 Ziro

Demographics of Arunachal Pradesh 

Demographics of Arunachal Pradesh – according to the 2011 census of India, the total population of Arunachal Pradesh is 13,82,611, of which 21,201,678 (50.54%) are male and 20,745,680 (49.46%) are female, or 978 females per 1000 males.

Religion demographics of Arunachal Pradesh 

Religion demographics of Arunachal Pradesh – according to the 2011 Indian Census, the religions of Arunachal Pradesh break down as follows:

 Christian: 418,732 (30.26%)
 Hindu: 401,876 (29.04%)
 Others (mostly Donyi-Polo): 362,553 (26.2%)
 Buddhist: 162,815 (11.76%)
 Muslim: 27,045 (1.9%)
 Sikh: 1,865 (0.1%)
 Jain: 216 (<0.1%)

Language demographics of Arunachal Pradesh 

Language demographics of Arunachal Pradesh – Arunachal Pradesh is one of the linguistically richest and most diverse regions in all of Asia, being home to at least 30 and possibly as many as 50 distinct languages in addition to innumerable dialects and subdialects thereof.

Government and politics of Arunachal Pradesh 

Politics of Arunachal Pradesh

 Form of government: Indian state government (parliamentary system of representative democracy)
 Capital of Arunachal Pradesh: Itanagar
 Elections in Arunachal Pradesh
 1978 Arunachal Pradesh Legislative Assembly election
 1980 Arunachal Pradesh Legislative Assembly election
 2004 Arunachal Pradesh Legislative Assembly election
2009 Arunachal Pradesh Legislative Assembly election
2014 Arunachal Pradesh Legislative Assembly election;

Union government in Arunachal Pradesh 
 Indian general election, 2009 (Arunachal Pradesh)
 Indian general election, 2014 (Arunachal Pradesh)
 Congressional representation of Arunachal Pradesh
 Rajya Sabha members from Arunachal Pradesh
 Arunachal East (Lok Sabha constituency)
 Arunachal West (Lok Sabha constituency)
 Arunachal Pradesh Congress Committee

Indian military in Arunachal Pradesh 

 Arunachal Scouts

Branches of the government of Arunachal Pradesh 

Government of Arunachal Pradesh

Executive branch of the government of Arunachal Pradesh 

 Head of state: Governor of Arunachal Pradesh, 
 Raj Bhavan – official residence of the Governor
 Head of government: Chief Minister of Arunachal Pradesh, 
 Departments and agencies of Arunachal Pradesh
 Department of Environment and Forest of Arunachal Pradesh
 Arunachal Pradesh Public Service Commission

Legislative branch of the government of Arunachal Pradesh 

Arunachal Pradesh Legislative Assembly
 Constituencies of Arunachal Pradesh Legislative Assembly

Judicial branch of the government of Arunachal Pradesh 

 Gauhati High Court

Law and order in Arunachal Pradesh 

 Law enforcement in Arunachal Pradesh
 Arunachal Pradesh Police

History of Arunachal Pradesh 

History of Arunachal Pradesh

History of Arunachal Pradesh, by period

Prehistoric Arunachal Pradesh

Ancient Arunachal Pradesh

Medieval Arunachal Pradesh 
History of Arunachal Pradesh[edit]
History of Arunachal Pradesh

History of Arunachal Pradesh, by period[edit]
Prehistoric Arunachal Pradesh[edit]
Ancient Arunachal Pradesh[edit]
Medieval Arunachal Pradesh[edit]
Colonial Arunachal Pradesh[edit]
Contemporary Arunachal Pradesh[edit]
North-East Frontier Agency (1951 to 20 January 1972) – part of Assam
Union Territory of Arunachal Pradesh (20 January 1972 to 20 February 1987.)
History of Arunachal Pradesh, by region[edit]
Historical places in Arunachal Pradesh[edit]
Gomsi
Ita Fort

Colonial Arunachal Pradesh

Contemporary Arunachal Pradesh 

 North-East Frontier Agency (1951 to 20 January 1972) – part of Assam
 Union Territory of Arunachal Pradesh (20 January 1972 to 20 February 1987.)

History of Arunachal Pradesh, by region

Historical places in Arunachal Pradesh 

 Gomsi
 Ita Fort

History of Arunachal Pradesh, by subject

Culture of Arunachal Pradesh 

Culture of Arunachal Pradesh
 Architecture of Arunachal Pradesh
 Cuisine of Arunachal Pradesh
 Languages of Arunachal Pradesh
 Language isolates and independent language families in Arunachal
 Monuments in Arunachal Pradesh
 Monuments of National Importance in Arunachal Pradesh
 State Protected Monuments in Arunachal Pradesh
 World Heritage Sites in Arunachal Pradesh

Art in Arunachal Pradesh 

 Music of Arunachal Pradesh

People of Arunachal Pradesh 

People of Arunachal Pradesh
 People from Arunachal Pradesh

Religion in Arunachal Pradesh 

Religion in Arunachal Pradesh
 Christianity in Arunachal Pradesh

Sports in Arunachal Pradesh 

Sports in Arunachal Pradesh
 Cricket in Arunachal Pradesh
 Arunachal Pradesh Cricket Association
 Football in Arunachal Pradesh
 Arunachal Pradesh Football Association
 Arunachal Pradesh football team

Symbols of Arunachal Pradesh 

Symbols of Arunachal Pradesh
 State Bird: Hornbill
 State Flower: Foxtail Orchid
 State Animal: Gayal (AKA mithun)
 State Tree: Hollong

Economy and infrastructure of Arunachal Pradesh 

Economy of Arunachal Pradesh
 Tourism in Arunachal Pradesh
 Transport in Arunachal Pradesh
 Roads in Arunachal Pradesh
 Highways in Arunachal Pradesh
 Proposed roads
 East-West Industrial Corridor Highway, Arunachal Pradesh

Education in Arunachal Pradesh 

Education in Arunachal Pradesh
 Institutions of higher education in Arunachal Pradesh
 National Institute of Technology, Arunachal Pradesh
 All Arunachal Pradesh Students' Union

See also 

 Outline of India
Fact about Arunachal Pradesh

References

External links 

 Tourism in Arunachal Pradesh (Official)
 Arunachal Pradesh Territorial Dispute between India and China, Inventory of Conflict and Environment
 reviewNE – all things North East India
 STD Codes of Arunachal Pradesh
 Languages of Arunachal Pradesh (Roger Blench)

Arunachal Pradesh
Arunachal Pradesh